Carsten Haitzler (born 1975), known as Raster or Rasterman to the open source community, is an Australian-German software engineer, best known for initiating and leading the development of the Enlightenment window manager and its libraries.

Life and work
Carsten Haitzler was born in Nigeria of a German father and Finnish mother, but soon moved with his family to Germany where he lived until the age of four. 

Haitzler then moved to Sydney, Australia where he attended the University of New South Wales, graduating with a bachelor's degree in computer science. In 1997 Haitzler moved to North Carolina, U.S. to work for Red Hat in the development of the CORBA, Xlib, GTK+ libraries, then later moved to work with VA Linux Systems.

In Sydney, Haitzler worked for Fluffy Spider Technologies where he refined, optimized and commercialized the basic Enlightenment Foundation Libraries (EFL) for Enlightenment 0.17. Fluffy Spider Technologies use some of EFL for their embedded Linux graphical user interface FancyPants.

After working for Morgan Stanley in Tokyo, he worked for Openmoko, decided that it "turned out to be a non-working thing for me, so I resigned". Between 2010 and 2018 he worked on Samsung's Linux platform Tizen.

Other software Haitzler has contributed to includes Electric Eyes, GTK+ theme engines, Imlib, Imlib2 and Epplets.

References

External links
Carsten Rasterman Haitzler's private site
LWN Linux Timeline, June, 1999.
ESD White Paper, RHS 1999.
Fluffy Spider Technologies website.
Linux 2000 UK Linux Developers' Conference.
SLUG codefest February, 2003.

Living people
1975 births
University of New South Wales alumni
Geeknet
Australian people of German descent
Australian people of Finnish descent
German people of Finnish descent